Mary International Airport is the third largest international airport in Turkmenistan. In March 2009, the airport was expanded with a new terminal and opened a US$5 million, two-story, 3,500-square-meter terminal and upgraded its status from provincial to international airport. The airport is located 6 km. north-east of the centre of Mary.

Airlines and destinations

References

External links

Airports in Turkmenistan